Boghammar Marin AB is a small family-owned company on Lidingö, Sweden that specializes in the construction and building of aluminium boats like fast patrol boats, police boats, passenger vessels, sea fisheries/protection vessels and so on.

The company was founded in 1906 by the brothers Anders Gustafsson and Reinhold Andersson as Gustafsson & Andersson and was until 1913 located in Stockholm. Since 1928 the company has made aluminium boats. They made boats under the trademark "Bogbåt" and they later adopted Boghammar as the family name. In the 1980s the company became internationally known when they built patrol boats for Iran. The boats were prepared to be fitted with weapons and became known as boghammars.

References

External links 
 Boghammar Marin AB

Shipbuilding companies of Sweden
Defence companies of Sweden
Lidingö Municipality
Companies based in Stockholm County